Kenan Šarić (born 18 December 1997) is a Bosnian professional footballer who plays as a left winger.

Career 
On 26 January 2021, Šarić joined Bosnian Premier League side Mladost Doboj Kakanj mid-2020–21 season from Radnik Bijeljina. He left the club in June 2021 after the club was unable to obtain a league license for the following season. Šarić scored two goals and made three assists in the 2020–21 season for both clubs.

On 30 June 2021, Šarić returned to Radnik Bijeljina. Despite being a key player for the club during the 2021–22 season, scoring three goals in 19 games, his side was relegated; he left the club in summer 2022.

Style of play 
Šarić is a fast left winger.

References

External links
 

1997 births
Living people
Footballers from Sarajevo
Bosnia and Herzegovina footballers
Association football wingers
FK Radnik Hadžići players
FK Famos Hrasnica players
NK Bosna Visoko players
NK Zvijezda Gradačac players
FK Radnik Bijeljina players
FK Mladost Doboj Kakanj players
Premier League of Bosnia and Herzegovina players